The Grammy Award – Best Album Notes has been presented since 1964. From 1973 to 1976 (the 15th through 18th Awards), a second award was presented for Best Album Notes – Classical. Those awards are listed under those years below. The award recognizes albums with excellent album notes, sometimes referred to as liner notes. It is presented to the album notes author or authors, not to the artists or performers on the winning work, except if the artist is also the album notes author.

Years reflect the year in which the Grammy Awards were presented, for works released in the previous year.

Winners and nominees

References

Album Notes
Awards established in 1964